Miralem Ibrahimović  (born 18 January 1963) is a Bosnian retired footballer. He is not related to Zlatan Ibrahimović.

Club career
Ibrahimović played for NK Dinamo Zagreb in the Yugoslav First League and in the Croatian Prva HNL.

References

1963 births
Living people
People from Banovići
Association football goalkeepers
Yugoslav footballers
Bosnia and Herzegovina footballers
FK Jedinstvo Brčko players
GNK Dinamo Zagreb players
Zeytinburnuspor footballers
HNK Cibalia players
NK Jedinstvo Bihać players
Yugoslav First League players
Croatian Football League players
Süper Lig players
Bosnia and Herzegovina expatriate footballers
Expatriate footballers in Turkey
Bosnia and Herzegovina expatriate sportspeople in Turkey
Expatriate footballers in Croatia
Bosnia and Herzegovina expatriate sportspeople in Croatia
Association football goalkeeping coaches
Bosnia and Herzegovina expatriate sportspeople in Saudi Arabia